Helophora insignis is a species of sheetweb spider in the family Linyphiidae. It is found in North America, Europe, Caucasus, a range from Russia (European to Far East), and China.

References

External links

 

Linyphiidae
Articles created by Qbugbot
Spiders described in 1841